Lef Nosi (born Elefter Nosi; 9 April 187720 February 1946) was an Albanian publisher, archivist, philologist, folklorist, ethnographer, numismatist, archaeologist and politician. On 28 November 1912, he was as one of the signatories of the Declaration of Independence, representing Elbasan. During the Second World War, Nosi was a leading member of Balli Kombëtar and was chosen as a member of the Albanian High Council.

Biography

Early life
Lef Nosi was born on 9 April 1877 of a wealthy family in Elbasan. He supported the Congress of Elbasan in August 1909 and was director of the respected Normal School (Shkolla Normale) in his native town. On 25 March 1910, he began editing the weekly newspaper Tomorri (Tomorr). Nosi was also a committee member of the Albanian club in Elbasan. During the Albanian revolt of 1912 Nosi was one of two delegates representing Elbasan sent to Kosovo that partook in negotiations between Albanian rebels and the Ottoman state regarding Albanian sociopolitical and cultural interests.

Early political period
Lef Nosi was present at the declaration of independence in Vlora in 1912 and was one of the signatories.  After the establishment of an independent Albania, Nosi was made postmaster general.  Nosi took part in the Congress of Durrës in 1918, was briefly minister of national economy, and attended the Paris Peace Conference in 1919 as part of the Albanian delegation led by Msgr. Luigj Bumci.

Retirement from politics
Lef Nosi retired from politics and lived in Elbasan between 1929 and 1938, where he divided his time between business and historical research. Lef Nosi was a scholar and collector of manuscripts and early 20th-century documents. He had a passionate interest in archeology and ethnography. Edith Durham called him the only Albanian who understood the value of folklore. He is remembered in particular as editor, from 1924 on, of a collection of historical documents under the title Dokumenta historike per t'i sherbye histories tone kombetare(Historical Documents to Serve Our National History). Nosi was a close friend of Scottish anthropologist Margaret Hasluck, who lived in Albania for 13 years, principally in Elbasan.

Despite being born as an orthodox Christian of the Patriarchate of Constantinople, Nosi had longed to form an autocephalous orthodox church of Albania. Lef Nosi was Noli's old friend who had helped Noli when he became a priest. Lef Nosi helped Noli form the Albanian Orthodox Church within Albania and had wished that Fan Noli was bishop and head of the church.

World War II
In June 1943, Lef Nosi joined the Balli Kombëtar and became a leading figure of the collaboration with Fascist and Nazis. In October 1943, during the German occupation, he was chosen as president of the national assembly and was elected to the High Regency Council(Keshilli i Larte i Regjences). The assembly under Nosi passed a series of decrees that fundamentally altered Albanian's Italian-established constitution. The union with Italy was officially dissolved; many of the laws passed after the Italian invasion were revoked; and Albania was declared free, neutral and independent.

He resigned from the position in October 1944 when German troops were evacuating Albania and it became evident that the communist partisans would soon take control.

Arrest and death
Lef Nosi was arrested while endeavouring to flee from Tirana where he had been hiding for some time. He had previously been pursued for three days in Elbasan, but he escaped, assisted by his wealthy nephew Vasil Nosi. Vasil then fell into the hands of Koci Xoxe, who tortured him by boiling his feet until he betrayed his uncle's hiding-place.

Lef Nosi was brought to trial in February 1946, led by general judge Irakli Bozo and prosecuted by Misto Treska. Along with Anton Harapi and former prime minister Maliq bey Bushati Nosi was condemned to death by communist Albania. According to the British Military Mission, which covered the trial: The trial took place, in eight sessions, in a squalid cinema in Tirana before a house packed by Party members who constantly interrupted and jeered, while three military judges on the stage kept hurling accusations and abuse at the defendants, jointly and severally. All three were held responsible for, among other things, Albania's entire war losses.... Defendant's counsel was howled down as a 'fascist' and never succeeded in making himself heard... The three accused were shot two days afterwards, on 15 February.

References
"History of Albanian People" Albanian Academy of Science.

Signatories of the Albanian Declaration of Independence
Balli Kombëtar
1877 births
1946 deaths
Executed politicians
Albanian people executed by the communist regime
Mayors of Elbasan
People from Elbasan
Members of the Albanian Orthodox Church
Albanian philanthropists
Albanian anti-communists
Albanian collaborators with Fascist Italy
Albanian collaborators with Nazi Germany
Government ministers of Albania
Economy ministers of Albania
All-Albanian Congress delegates
Congress of Elbasan delegates
Government of Durrës
Congress of Durrës delegates
Speakers of the Parliament of Albania
Members of the Parliament of Albania
Activists of the Albanian National Awakening
Educators from the Ottoman Empire